The following is a list of massacres that have occurred in South Africa (numbers may be approximate):

See also

 Political assassinations in post-apartheid South Africa
 Internal resistance to apartheid
 1993 raid on Mthatha

References

South Africa
Massacres

Massacres